Jon Toth (born February 11, 1994) is an American football center who is a free agent. Toth has also been a member of the New York Jets, DC Defenders, Cleveland Browns, Detroit Lions, and Washington Football Team / Commanders.

Early life and education
Toth was born on February 11, 1994, in Indianapolis, Indiana. He attended Brebeuf Jesuit Preparatory School there, playing football, basketball, lacrosse, and track and field. He was named to the Indiana Football Coaches Association all-state team as a senior, and was ranked as the number 33 best offensive guard by 247Sports.com.

After graduating from high school, Toth accepted a scholarship offer from University of Kentucky. As a true freshman, he sat out as a redshirt. Toth, in his second year, appeared in twelve games, starting the final eleven, and was named freshman All-SEC by league coaches. In addition to playing guard that year, he also saw time at the center position. He started all twelve games as a sophomore, and was named conference player of the week after the first game of the season. He again started every game as a junior. He finished his college career with 48 straight starts, a school record.

Professional career

Philadelphia Eagles
After going unselected in the 2017 NFL Draft, Toth was signed as an undrafted free agent by the Philadelphia Eagles on December 1, 2017 to the practice squad. He was released from the practice squad on December 26. He was re-signed on a reserve/future contract on January 9, 2018. While he was on a reserve/future contract, the Eagles beat the New England Patriots 41–33 in Super Bowl LII. He was released at the 2018 roster cuts and subsequently signed to the practice squad. He was released from the practice squad on September 25.

New York Jets
Toth was signed by the New York Jets to the practice squad on October 22, 2018. He was signed to a futures contract on December 31. He was released on August 31, 2019.

DC Defenders
Toth joined the DC Defenders of the newly-formed XFL in 2020, starting five games before the league suspended.

Cleveland Browns
Toth was signed by the Cleveland Browns on August 27, 2020, but was released a week later.

Detroit Lions
On December 22, 2020, Toth was signed to the practice squad by the Detroit Lions. He was released on January 11, 2021.

Washington Football Team / Commanders
Toth was signed by the Washington Football Team on August 9, 2021. He was waived on August 24 but re-signed two days later. He was then waived on August 31, re-signed to the practice squad one day later, and released again on August 9. He returned to the team on November 8, being signed to the practice squad. He was elevated to the active roster for their game against the Seattle Seahawks, and reverted back afterwards. He was promoted to the active roster on December 11, 2021.

On August 30, 2022, Toth was waived by the Commanders and signed to the practice squad the next day. He was released again on October 4, 2022.

St. Louis BattleHawks
Toth was selected in the 2023 XFL Draft by the St. Louis BattleHawks.

Personal life
Toth has modeled for big-and-tall clothing brands.

References

External links
Kentucky Wildcats bio

1994 births
Living people
American football centers
American football offensive guards
Kentucky Wildcats football players
Philadelphia Eagles players
New York Jets players
Cleveland Browns players
Detroit Lions players
Washington Football Team players
Washington Commanders players
Male models from Indiana
St. Louis BattleHawks players